Jayachamarajendra Wadiyar (Kannada: ಜಯಚಾಮರಾಜೇಂದ್ರ ಒಡೆಯರು, 18 July 1919 – 23 September 1974), sometimes simply Jayachamaraja Wadiyar, was the twenty-fifth and last ruling Maharaja of Mysore, reigning from 1940 to 1950, who later served as the governor of Mysore until 1964 and as governor of Madras from 1964 to 1966.

Wadiyar ascended the throne upon the sudden demise of his uncle Maharaja Krishnaraja Wadiyar IV. His reign as King began in 1940 during the onset of World War II in Europe and concluded with his merging the Kingdom into the Dominion of India in 1947 but continued as maharaja until India's constitution into a republic in 1950. Kuvempu, his Kannada teacher and the vice-chancellor of Mysore University, remarked upon his ceding the kingdom: "Whereas kings have become so upon assuming thrones, he became a great king by renouncing one".

Early life

Jayachamarajendra Wadiyar was born on 18 July 1919 at Mysore Palace as the only son and the last child of Yuvaraja Kanteerava Narasimharaja Wadiyar and Yuvarani Kempu Cheluvajamanni. He had three elder sisters: Princesses Vijaya Devi, Sujayakantha Devi, and Jayachamundi Devi.Jayachamarajendra Wadiyar graduated from Maharaja's College, Mysore, in 1938, earning five awards and gold medals from Mysore University. He was married the same year, on 15 May 1938, to Maharani Satya Prema Kumari at the Palace. He toured Europe during 1939, visiting many associations in London and became acquainted with many artists and scholars.

Reign

Accession 
In March 1940, Jayachamarajendra Wadiyar lost his father Yuvaraja Kanteerava Narasimharaja Wadiyar who was second in line to the throne. Five months later, his reigning uncle, Maharaja Krishnaraja Wadiyar IV too expired, leaving his only nephew, Jayachamaraja Wadiyar, to succeed him to reign in what was dubbed one of the most prosperous states in Asia. He ascended the throne of the Kingdom of Mysore on 8 September 1940 and was democratic in his administration, celebrated by his subjects as his uncle was.

Ceding the kingdom 
Jayachamarajendra Wadiyar was the first ruler to accede to merge his kingdom with the newly formed tentative Indian Union after India's independence in 1947. He signed an instrument of accession with the Union on the eve of India's attainment of independence on 15 August 1947. The result took three years to materialise owing to the drafting of a constitution for the country in the meantime.

With the constitution of India into a republic, the Kingdom of Mysore was merged with the Republic on 26 January 1950. He held the position of Rajpramukh (governor) of the State of Mysore from 26 January 1950 to 1 November 1956. After the integration of the neighbouring Kannada-majority parts of the States of Madras and Hyderabad, he became the first governor of the reorganised Mysore State, from 1 November 1956 to 4 May 1964 and was the Governor of the State of Madras from 4 May 1964 to 28 June 1966.

After the state was absorbed into the Dominion of India, he was granted a privy purse, certain privileges, and the use of the title Maharaja of Mysore by the Government of India, However, all forms of compensation were ended in 1971 by the 26th Amendment to the Constitution of India.

Contributions

Sports 
He was a good horseman and a tennis player who helped Ramanathan Krishnan to participate at Wimbledon. He was also well known for his marksmanship and was highly sought-after by his subjects whenever a rogue elephant or a man-eating tiger attacked their immediate surroundings. There are many wildlife trophies attributed to him in the Palace collections. He was responsible for the famous cricketer/off-spin bowler, E. A. S. Prasanna's visit to West Indies as his father was otherwise reluctant to send him.

Music 
He was a connoisseur of both western and Carnatic (South Indian classical) music and an acknowledged authority of Indian philosophy. He helped the Western world discover the music of a little-known Russian composer Nikolai Medtner (1880–1951), financing the recording of a large number of his compositions and founding the Medtner Society in 1949. Medtner's Third Piano Concerto is dedicated to the Maharaja of Mysore.  He became a Licentiate of the Guildhall School of Music, London and honorary Fellow of Trinity College of Music, London, in 1945. Aspirations to become a concert pianist were cut short by the untimely death of both his father the Yuvaraja Kanteerava Narasimharaja Wadiyar in 1939, and his uncle the Maharaja Krishnaraja Wadiyar IV in 1940, when he succeeded to the throne of Mysore.

He was the first president of the Philharmonia Concert Society, London in 1948. See below copy of the programme sheets of some of the earliest concerts held at Royal Albert Hall on 13 April, 27 April – 11 May 1949.

Walter Legge, who was invited to Mysore by the Maharaja in this regard has stated:

 "The visit to Mysore was a fantastic experience. The Maharajah was a young man, not yet thirty. In one of his palaces he had a record library containing every imaginable recordings of serious music, a large range of loud speakers, and several concert grand pianos...."

 "In the weeks I stayed there, the Maharajah agreed to paying for the recordings of the Medtner piano concertos, an album of his songs, and some of his chamber music; he also agreed to give me a subvention of 10,000 pounds a year for three years to enable me to put the Philharmonia Orchestra and the Philharmonia Concert society on firm basis...."

This largesse proved sufficient to transform Legge's fortunes in 1949. He was able to engage Herbert von Karajan as conductor. The repertory the young Maharajah wished to sponsor were Balakirev's Symphony, Roussel's Fourth Symphony, Busoni's Indian Fantasy etc. The association produced some of the most memorable recordings of the post-war period.

The Maharaja also enabled Richard Strauss's last wish to be fulfilled by sponsoring an evening at the Royal Albert Hall by London's Philharmonia Orchestra with German conductor Wilhelm Furtwängler in the lead and soprano Kirsten Flagstad singing his Four Last Songs in 1950.

The Maharaja was equally a good critic of music. When asked by Legge to pass judgement on recent additions to the EMI catalogue, his views were as trenchant as they were refreshingly unpredictable. He was thrilled by Karajan's Vienna Philharmonic recording of Beethoven's Fifth Symphony ('as Beethoven wished it to be'), held Furtwängler's recording of the Fourth Symphony in high esteem, and was disappointed by Alceo Galliera's account of the Seventh Symphony, which he would have preferred Karajan to record. Above all, he expressed serious doubts about Arturo Toscanini's recordings. 'The speed and energy are those of a demon', he wrote to Legge, 'not an angel or superman as one would ardently hope for'. One of the reasons he so admired Furtwängler's Beethoven was that it was 'such a tonic after Toscanini's highly strung, vicious performances'.

Writing in the July 1950 edition of "THE GRAMOPHONE"  Walter Legge sums Maharajas's monumental contribution to Western Classical Music:

....Many more correspondents have written expressing their admiration for the vision, constructive enterprise and generosity of the young Indian Prince who conceived this plan, and who is making it possible for the music lovers throughout the world to learn, enjoy and study works which but for his knowledge and love of music, would never have been recorded.....

After becoming Maharaja, he was initiated to the Indian classical music (Carnatic music) due to the cultural vibrancy which prevailed in the Mysore court till then. He learnt to play veena under Vid. Venkatagiriappa and mastered the nuances of carnatic music under the tutelage of veteran composer and Asthan Vidwan Sri. Vasudevacharya. He was also initiated into the secrets of Shri Vidya as an upasaka (under assumed name Chitprabhananda) by his guru Shilpi Siddalingaswamy. This inspired him to compose as many as 94 carnatic music krutis under the assumed name of Shri Vidya. All the compositions are in different ragas and some of them for the first time ever. In the process He also built three temples in Mysore city: Bhuvaneshvari Temple and Gayatri Temple, located inside the Mysore Palace Fort, and Sri Kamakaameshwari Temple, situated on Ramanuja Road, Mysore. All three temples were sculpted by the maharaja's guru and famous sculptor, Shilpi Siddalingaswamy.  His 94 compositions were published by his son-in law Sri. R.Raja Chandra as "Sree Vidyaa Gaana Vaaridhi"  in 2010. The book was edited by Sri. S. Krishna Murthy, grandson of Maharaja's Guru Sri. Mysore Vasudevacaharya.

Many noted Indian musicians received patronage at his court, including Mysore Vasudevachar, Veena Venkatagiriyappa, B. Devendrappa, V. Doraiswamy Iyengar, T. Chowdiah, Tiger Vardachar, Chennakeshaviah, Titte Krishna Iyengar, S. N. Mariappa, Chintalapalli Ramachandra Rao, R. N. Doreswamy, H. M. Vaidyalinga Bhagavatar.

The patronage and contribution of Wadiyars to carnatic music was researched in the 1980s by Prof. Mysore Sri V. Ramarathnam, Retired First Principal of the University College of Music and Dance, University of Mysore. The research was conducted under the sponsorship of University Grants Commission, Government of India. Prof. Mysore Sri V. Ramarathnam authored the book Contribution and Patronage of Wadiyars to Music that was published Kannada Book Authority, Bangalore.

Famous compositions 
Wadiyar is credited with the creation of raga Jayasamvardini. Other notable compositions of his include the following:

Literary works 
The Quest for Peace: an Indian Approach, University of Minnesota, Minneapolis 1959.
Dattatreya: The Way & The Goal, Allen & Unwin, London 1957.
The Gita and Indian Culture, Orient Longmans, Bombay, 1963.
Religion And Man, Orient Longmans, Bombay, 1965. Based on Prof. Ranade Series Lectures instituted at Karnataka University in 1961.
Avadhuta: Reason & Reverence, Indian Institute of World Culture, Bangalore, 1958.
An Aspect of Indian Aesthetics, University of Madras, 1956.
Puranas As The Vehicles of India's Philosophy of History, Journal Purana, issue #5, 1963.
Advaita Philosophy, Sringeri Souvenir Volume, 1965, pages 62–64.
Sri Suresvaracharya, Sringeri Souvenir Volume, Srirangam, 1970, pages 1–8.
Kundalini Yoga, A review of "Serpent Power" by Sir John Woodroff.
 Note on Ecological Surveys to precede Large Irrigation Projects- Wesley Press, Mysore; 1955
 African Survey-Bangalore Press; 1955
 The Virtuous Way of Life – Mountain Path – July 1964 edition

He also sponsored the translation of many classics from Sanskrit to Kannada as part of the Jayachamaraja Grantha Ratna Mala, including 35 parts of the Rigveda. These are essentially ancient, sacred scriptures in Sanskrit till then not available in Kannada language comprehensively. All the books contain original text in Kannada accompanied by Kannada translation in simple language for the benefit of common man. In the history of Kannada literature such a monumental work was never attempted! As Late H. Gangadhara Shastry – Asthan (court) Astrologer and Dharmadhikari of Mysore Palace – who himself has contributed substantially in the above works -has stated that Maharaja used to study each and everyone of these works and discuss them with the authors. It seems on a festival night (on shivaratri), he was summoned in the middle of the night and advised him to simplify the use of some difficult Kannada words in one of the books. The digital version of Rigveda samhita that was first published under Jayachamaraja Grantha Ratna Mala was developed by C S Yogananda at Sriranga Digital Software Technologies during 2009.

During his reign, he also encouraged historical research on modern lines and this finds an echo in the dedication of the encyclopedic work by C. Hayavadana Rao entitled " History of Mysore" in three voluminous works published from 1943–46. Author's words are quite illuminating and worth quoting. Author says:

"Dedicated by gracious permission to His Highness, Sri Jayacahamaraja Wadiyar Bahadur, Maharaja of Mysore- Ruler, Scholar, and patron of Arts and sciences and supporter of every good cause aiming at the moral and material progress of the people – In token of His Highness' deep and abiding interest in the scientific study of History and pursuit of Historical Research along modern lines".

It aptly sums up the personality of the Maharaja. It is matter of regret that the author could not complete the work as originally intended and had to stop at the year 1949 as Maharaja had to accede to the wishes of his people and merge his Kingdom with the Republic of India in 1950.

Death 
Jayachamaraja Wadiyar died at the age of 55 on 23 September 1974 at his Bangalore Palace; he was the last living person who had been the premier king of a state with a 21-gun salute status in British India. He was succeeded by his son Srikantadatta Narasimharaja Wadiyar as the head of the Royal Family and the ceremonial maharaja of Mysore.

Family 

Jayachamaraja Wadiyar married Maharani Sathya Prema Kumari of Jigni province on 15 May 1938. The marriage failed; the maharani returned to and settled at Jaipur. There were no children by this marriage.

On 6 May 1942, two years into his accession as maharaja, Jayachamaraja Wadiyar married Maharani Tripura Sundari Devi. The couple has six children: Maharajakumari Gayatri Devi (1946–1974), who predeceased her father due to cancer; Rajakumari Meenakshi Devi (b. 1951, d. 2015); Yuvaraja Srikantadatta Narasimharaja Wadiyar (b. 1953, d. 2013); Rajakumari Kamakshi Devi (b.1954); Rajakumari Indrakshi Devi (b.1956); and Rajakumari Vishalakshi Devi Avaru (b. 1962, d. 2018).

Both the queens died in 1982 within a span of 15 days.

Honours and memorials

Fellowships and memberships 
 Fellow and president of the National Academy of Music, Dance and Drama, New Delhi, 1966
 First chairman of the Indian Wildlife Board

Honours 
 Knight Grand Commander of the Most Exalted Order of the Star of India (GCSI), 1945
 Knight Grand Cross of the Most Honourable Order of the Bath (GCB) in 1946

Honorary doctorates 
 Doctor of Literature from the University of Queensland, Australia.  
 Doctor of Literature from Annamalai University, Tamil Nadu.
 Doctor of Law from Banaras Hindu University
 Doctor of Laws, honoris causa from the University of Mysore, 1962

Memorials 

 Hardinge Circle at Mysore was renamed Jayachamaraja Circle with the maharaja's life-size statue
 Jayanagar, Mysore, Jayanagar, Bangalore, and Jayachamaraja Road, Bangalore are named in the maharaja's honour
 Jaganmohana Palace at Mysore was renamed Sri Jayachamarajendra Art Gallery in his memory

References

External links

Speech as a Freemason
Profile at the Mysore Samachar 
Jaya Chamaraja, the last Maharaja

Kings of Mysore
Wadiyar dynasty
Hindu monarchs
Knights Grand Cross of the Order of the Bath
Knights Grand Commander of the Order of the Star of India
Indian knights
1919 births
1974 deaths
Maharaja's College, Mysore alumni
Rajpramukhs
20th-century Indian poets
Indian Freemasons
Recipients of the Sangeet Natak Akademi Fellowship